Darrell Thomas Pasloski (born December 2, 1960) is a territorial politician from Yukon, Canada, who was leader of the Yukon Party, and served as the eighth premier of Yukon from 2011 to 2016.  His party was defeated in the general election of November, 2016, and he lost his own seat. He was succeeded by Sandy Silver as Premier of Yukon on December 3, 2016.

Early life

The oldest of three children, Darrell Pasloski was born in St. Boniface, Manitoba, with his family moving to Saskatchewan when he was a year old. Between grades 6 – 9, Pasloski and his family resided in High Level, Alberta, which was booming at the time with 1,000-1,500 people in the community.

Pasloski attended the College of Pharmacy at the University of Saskatchewan in Saskatoon, though he initially considered medical school. In 1982, Pasloski graduated with distinction from the College of Pharmacy.
 
Following graduation, he moved to Red Deer, Alberta for his first job.
 
Pasloski took a new position with Shoppers Drug Mart in Red Deer in 1986.  The following year, he took over as the store owner. In June, 1987, Pasloski opened the first Shoppers Drug Mart in Yorkton, Sask.

In 1991, he moved to Whitehorse and took over the Shoppers Drug Mart at Qwanlin Mall and later purchased the second Shoppers Drug Mart on Main Street.

By 2009, Pasloski relinquished ownership of both Shoppers Drug Mart locations and people began encouraging him to run territorially and for leadership of the Yukon Party.

Political career
Pasloski ran for a seat to the Canadian House of Commons in the 2008 Canadian federal election under the Conservative banner. He finished second place to incumbent Larry Bagnell in a four way race in the Yukon electoral district.

Pasloski ran for leadership of the territorial Yukon Party and won at a convention held on May 28, 2011, winning over MLA Jim Kenyon and businessman Rod Taylor. He was formally sworn in as leader and premier on June 11. He was not a sitting member of the Yukon Legislative Assembly at the time of his investiture as premier; however, he won a seat in the 2011 election, representing the new electoral district of Mountainview.

Pasloski's government was defeated in the 2016 election in which he came in third in his constituency. He announced his resignation as Yukon Party leader on election night.

Election record

Yukon general election, 2016

|-

| Liberal
| Jeanie Dendys
| align="right"| 439
| align="right"| 34.6%
| align="right"| +14.5%
|-

| NDP
| Shaunagh Stikeman
| align="right"| 432
| align="right"| 34.0%
| align="right"| -1.0%
|-

|-
! align=left colspan=3|Total
! align=right| 1,270
! align=right| 100.0%
! align=right| –
|}

Yukon general election, 2011

|-

|-

| NDP
| Stephen Dunbar-Edge
| align="right"| 376
| align="right"| 35.0%
| align="right"| –
|-

| Liberal
| Dave Sloan
| align="right"| 216
| align="right"| 20.1%
| align="right"| –
|-
! align=left colspan=3|Total
! align=right| 1,072
! align=right| 100.0%
! align=right| –
|}

Canadian federal election, 2008

Personal life

Pasloski is married and has four grown children.

References

1960s births
Living people
Conservative Party of Canada candidates for the Canadian House of Commons
Premiers of Yukon
People from Saint Boniface, Winnipeg
Politicians from Whitehorse
Politicians from Winnipeg
Canadian pharmacists
University of Saskatchewan alumni
Yukon political party leaders
Yukon Party MLAs
Members of the Executive Council of Yukon
Heads of government who were later imprisoned